Beckett Nunatak is a flattish, mostly bare rock nunatak lying  west of Mount Armytage and south of Harbord Glacier in Victoria Land. It was mapped by the United States Geological Survey from ground surveys and from U. S. Navy air photos, and named by the Advisory Committee on Antarctic Names in 1964 for W.T. Beckett, a utilities man at McMurdo Station, 1963.

References 

Nunataks of Victoria Land
Scott Coast